The Virginia Tech Hokies college football program are part of the National Collegiate Athletic Association (NCAA) Division I Football Bowl Subdivision (FBS). Since the team's creation in 1891 by professor Ellison A. Smyth—who coached the team in its first game, which was played the next year—the Hokies have participated in more than 1,100 officially sanctioned games, including 32 bowl games.

Historically, the Hokies have had limited success. From 1892 to 1921, Tech competed as a football independent. The Hokies won several games against larger, better-funded teams during this time, but did not compete in many games outside the American South. From 1921 to 1964, Tech was a member of the Southern Conference and won the conference championship in 1963. The membership of the Southern Conference fluctuated wildly at times during Tech's tenure. When the conference was created in 1921, it boasted 23 teams. This number was reduced when the Southeastern Conference and Atlantic Coast Conference split away in 1932 and 1953, respectively. By the time Tech won the conference championship in 1963, the conference's membership had shrunk to less than 10 teams. Tech administrators, wanting to expand the football program, chose to leave the conference and become a football independent once more.

Though Tech joined athletic conferences in other sports during the 1980s, it remained a football independent until 1991, when Virginia Tech became a member of the Big East conference. In 1993, Tech received an invitation to the Independence bowl, beginning a streak that has seen the Hokies invited to a bowl game at the conclusion of every season until 2020,. In 1995, the Hokies defeated the Texas Longhorns in the 1995 Sugar Bowl, vaulting them into national prominence. In recent years, Virginia Tech football teams have been ranked among the best in the country according to season-ending polls. In 2000, Virginia Tech participated in the 2000 Sugar Bowl, which served as the national championship game of the 1999 college football season. In addition to that appearance, the Hokies have participated in several other Bowl Championship Series games, which represent the highest tier of postseason accomplishment. In 2009, the Hokies defeated the Cincinnati Bearcats in the 2009 Orange Bowl.

Today, the Hokies are a member of the Atlantic Coast Conference (ACC) and have competed in that conference since 2004, when the Hokies left the Big East. Tech won three Big East conference championships prior to departing that conference, and since joining the ACC, the Hokies have won that conference four times.

Seasons

See also

 Virginia Tech Hokies football
 Virginia Tech bowl games

Footnotes

References

Reference sources

 Lazenby, Roland. Legends: A Pictorial History of Virginia Tech Football. Taylor, Full Court Press (1986) 
 Tandler, Rich. Hokie Games: Virginia Tech Football Game by Game 1945–2006. Game by Game Sports Media (September 15, 2007)

External links
Hokiesports.com - Official Virginia Tech Hokies football website

Virginia Tech Hokies

Virginia Tech Hokies football seasons